Hosting environment is a term used in telecommunication and Internet businesses. Hosting is a relatively new form of business between a vendor and a telecom operator.

About
The vendor normally sells equipment and services to a telecom operator. The equipment and services sold are used to provide a consumer service, like picture mail or download of ringback tones.

Due to the changing telecommunications business and a burst of a very large number of new consumer services, new business models are being created. The common two are revenue share and managed service hosting. This is where the term Hosting Environment comes from.

The hosting environment is the physical environment where hosting services are offered from. Typically hosting environment in telecommunication terms would be a Network Operating Centre (NOC) housing the equipment needed to host a service. 

In simple words, the Hosting Environment mainly consists of two terms. First, the physical environment where the servers are located. Secondly, it also refers to the environment that you get with your hosting plan like shared, virtual private or dedicated. For example, a virtual private environment provides you with a totally isolated environment on the same server.

This can be broken down to include all hardware, including servers, routers and their cabinets. In most cases, the equipment would be rack-mounted and connected through one or more LANs. In order to provide security and allow multiple operators to use the same infrastructure, firewalls and sub-LANs may be used. The hosting environment would also include support systems like billing, and provisioning systems as well as Operation and maintenance system.

Further, this environment would provide connectivity to one or more telecom networks through gateways. The gateways in a hosting environment would indicate which telecom networks or systems can use the hosted services. As an example if the gateway is connected to a GSM MSC through an E1 connection then this hosting environment would provide hosted services to a GSM network. Similarly, if the gateway has connectivity for CDMA or WCDMA then the hosting environment would have services for CDMA and 3G networks as well.

The quality of the hosting environment would depend on the level of redundancy and high-available configurations. In best of environments, perhaps a remote site is configured in case of disaster. In a simpler environment, one may not even have mirrored disks. The same goes for O&M equipment and alarm handling. Companies offering telecom grade hosting environment will certainly provide more than 99.99% availability, redundant LANs and a robust SAN (Storage Area Network).

See also
 Dedicated hosting service
Shared web hosting service

References
2. 
 
 Hosting environment at TheFreeDictionary.com

Internet hosting
Service industries
Telecommunication services
Web hosting